Batchawana can refer to the following places in Algoma District, Ontario, Canada:

 Batchawana Bay
 Batchawana Bay, Ontario, community on the bay
 Batchawana Bay Provincial Park
 Batchawana Island, in Batchawana Bay
 Batchawana Mountain
 Batchawana River
 Batchawana River Provincial Park

See also
 Batchewana First Nation of Ojibways